"Radio Waves" is the opening track from Roger Waters' second solo studio album, Radio K.A.O.S. It was chosen as the lead single for the album, released worldwide in May 1987

Background
"Radio Waves" introduces the main character, Billy, a disabled man who finds a way to talk and become friends with a radio DJ. Billy is gifted and has the miracle of hearing and interpreting  radio waves in his head. He explores a cordless phone which was hidden in his wheelchair by his brother Benny, after destroying and robbing a store. Recognising its similarity to a radio, he experiments with the phone and is able to access computers and speech synthesizers, he learns to speak through them. He calls a radio station in L.A. named Radio KAOS, a completely fictitious radio station based in Los Angeles and tells them of his abilities and his life story throughout the album.

Track listings

Charts

References

External links
Radio Waves Discogs
Roger Waters official website

1987 songs
1987 singles
Roger Waters songs
Songs written by Roger Waters
Songs about radio
Song recordings produced by Roger Waters